Thodoros Maragos or (alternative form in Latin alphabet) Marangos (born in Filiatra in 1944) is a Greek film director. His work spans film, TV and documentaries. He is best known for his film Learn How to Read and Write, Son (in Greek: Μάθε παιδί μου γράμματα), a satire on fascism and one of the best anti-Junta films of all time. He has won four awards in the 14th Thessaloniki Film Festival (September 24–30, 1973) for his movie Get on Your Mark (original title in Greek: Λάβετε θέσεις). His box office major success, the 1981 film Learn How to Read and Write, Son, has also won four awards in the 22nd Thessaloniki Festival (October 5–11, 1981).

Filmography

2008 Boobheads
2005 Black Baaa... (Documentary)
2004 God Is Invisible Because He Is Minute (Documentary)
1994 Moon Runaway
1991 Polytehneio (Documentary)
1989-1990 Emmones Idees (TV Series)
1984 Ti ehoun na doun ta matia mou
1981 Learn How to Read and Write, Son
1980 Thanasi, sfixe ki allo to zonari
1978 Apo pou pane gia ti havouza
1977 Ergatiki kokkini Protomagia 77 (Documentary short)
1975 Struggle (Documentary)
1973 Get on Your Mark
1971 'Sssst (Short)
1971 Oikopedo (Short)
1969 Tsouf (Short)

References

External links
 

Greek film directors
Living people
Greek screenwriters
Year of birth missing (living people)
People from Filiatra